Xylorhiza cronquistii, common name Cronquist's woody-aster, is a plant species endemic to the Kaiparowits Plateau in Grand Staircase–Escalante National Monument in Kane County, Utah at elevations of 1900–2100 m.

Xylorhiza cronquistii is a subshrub up to 30 cm tall. Leaves are narrowly lanceolate, sometimes with small spines along the margins. Flowers are borne in heads containing 13-17 white ray flowers plus some yellow disc flowers.

References 

Astereae
Flora of Utah
Flora of the Colorado Plateau and Canyonlands region
Endemic flora of the United States
Grand Staircase–Escalante National Monument
Flora without expected TNC conservation status